Quietly is the third studio album by the sludge metal band Mouth of the Architect. Recorded at Red Room Recording and Woodshed Studios in Seattle, WA, it was released on Translation Loss Records on 22 July 2008.

Following the departure of Gregory Lahm, original guitarist Alex Vernon returned to the band alongside new guitarist Steve Brooks. Kevin Schindel joined as permanent bassist. This left Watkins and Mann as the sole remaining members who recorded previous album The Ties That Blind. "Generation of Ghosts" features vocals by Julie Christmas (Battle of Mice, Made Out of Babies).

The album was released on gatefold CD, limited edition 300 translucent and rainbow splatter double LP and limited edition 700 solid black and white swirl double LP.

Track listing

Personnel
Alex Vernon – vocals, guitar
Steven Brooks – vocals, guitar
Kevin Schindel – vocals, bass guitar
Jason Watkins – vocals, keyboards
Dave Mann – drums
Julie Christmas – vocals (track 5)
Chris Common – producer, engineer, mixer
Ed Brooks – mastering
Faith Coloccia – drawings, design, photography

References

Mouth of the Architect albums
2008 albums